Gunthanala is a village in Kurnool district of the Indian state of Andhra Pradesh. It is located in Nandyal mandal.

References 

Villages in Kurnool district